The 2006 Bridgestone Presents the Champ Car World Series Powered by Ford season was the 28th overall and the third and penultimate season of the Champ Car World Series era of American open wheel racing. It began on April 9, 2006 in Long Beach, California and ended on November 12 in Mexico City, Mexico after 14 races. The Bridgestone Presents the Champ Car World Series Powered by Ford Drivers' Champion was Sébastien Bourdais, his third consecutive championship. He was the first driver to win three American open wheel National Championships in a row since Ted Horn in 1948.  The Rookie of the Year was Will Power.

Drivers and teams 
The 2.65 liter turbo V8 Ford–Cosworth XFE engine continued to be the exclusive power plant for the series. Bridgestone also continued as the exclusive series tire supplier. The two companies continued the marketing agreement that branded the series Bridgestone Presents the Champ Car World Series Powered by Ford. All teams ran the Lola B02/00 chassis, the final year these chassis would be run in the series.

The following teams and drivers competed in the 2006 Champ Car season.

Team and driver changes 
 Newman/Haas Racing retained their 2005 Series Champion Sébastien Bourdais for the season, who was re-joined by Bruno Junqueira, who began the 2005 season with Newman-Haas but was replaced by Oriol Servià after sustaining a season-ending back injury in the 2005 Indianapolis 500. 
 Oriol Servià, in turn, joined PKV Racing, replacing Cristiano da Matta. Joining Servià was newcomer Katherine Legge, a three-time race winner in Champ Car's primary feeder series, the Toyota Atlantic Championship.  Legge became the first woman to run a full season of Champ Car racing.  
 PKV co-owner Jimmy Vasser, the 1996 IndyCar champion, drove a third team car at the Grand Prix of Long Beach.  While a preseason press release hinted at further appearances in 2006, it was Vasser's only appearance as a driver in a Champ Car until the 2008 Toyota Grand Prix of Long Beach, the final race contested under Champ Car rules.
 Two teams standing pat with their driving lineup for 2006 were Forsythe Championship Racing, retaining Paul Tracy and Mario Domínguez, and RuSPORT with Justin Wilson and A. J. Allmendinger.  However, both teams would see changes while the season was still young.
 Walker Racing continued its branding as Team Australia and kept the same drivers that they ended the 2005 season with, retaining both Alex Tagliani and Will Power. 
 Mi-Jack Conquest Racing kept Andrew Ranger from their 2005 team.  Ranger was joined by Charles Zwolsman Jr., the 2005 Toyota Atlantic Championship series champion. 
 CTE-HVM Racing signed two new drivers after using four last year, with Nelson Philippe matched up with rookie Dan Clarke as his teammate. 
 Dale Coyne Racing picked up the biggest wild card for 2006, signing 2002 series champion Cristiano da Matta as their number one driver alongside a debutant Belgian, Jan Heylen.
 Rocketsports Racing began the year as a one-car team.  Former WilliamsF1 driver Antônio Pizzonia signed on with a one-race contract for Long Beach.

Mid-season changes

Dutchman Nicky Pastorelli was announced as Rocketsports Racing's "full-time" driver on April 28. Pastorelli was a test driver for Jordan Grand Prix in 2005 and in October 2005 had been originally introduced as the third driver for the team which was renamed Midland F1 Racing after the 2005 season, but that opportunity fell through in December when one of Pastorelli's investors backed out of the deal. It would not be the last time Nicky would have sponsorship problems.
On June 9, following the race at the Milwaukee Mile, the RuSPORT team announced that they were replacing A. J. Allmendinger with Cristiano da Matta. The change was surprise, as Allmendinger had been the cornerstone of the team since its founding in 2002. The Champ Car series was temporarily left without an American driver.
On June 12 Forsythe Racing announced that they were parting company with Mario Domínguez. Domínguez had crashed on this opening lap of the Milwaukee race, taking out himself and his teammate Paul Tracy as well as Bruno Junqueira. The series stewards penalized him for the crash, stripping him of the points earned for his 14th-place finish. Two days later the open seat was filled as A. J. Allmendinger was announced as Domínguez's replacement at Forsythe, a pairing that was quickly rewarded with victories in the following three races starting at Portland. Meanwhile, Domínguez moved to Dale Coyne Racing to take the seat vacated by da Matta.
Rocketsports Racing expanded back to a two-car team beginning with the Portland race. Atlantic series veteran Tõnis Kasemets became the first Champ Car driver of Estonian descent. Kasemets was initially slated to run six races for the team, but would only end up running five races.
Rocketsports Racing reverted to a one-car team at Toronto when one of Nicky Pastorelli's sponsors defaulted and his #8 car was not run. The sponsorship problem was solved in time for the next round in Edmonton.
On August 3 Cristiano da Matta was seriously injured after colliding with a deer during testing at Road America.  While da Matta would eventually recover, the crash ended his open-wheel racing career. RuSPORT did not run da Matta's #10 car again until the final two rounds of the season when IndyCar veteran Ryan Briscoe made his Champ Car debut at his home race, Surfers Paradise.
Antônio Pizzonia returned to Rocketsports Racing as the driver of the #18 car for the race in Montreal. Pizzonia would go on to sit out the Road America round in favor of Tõnis Kasemets, but would finish out the remainder of the year for the team in the #18 car.
Mario Domínguez found a home at his third race team for the year by signing up to join Rocketsports Racing before the Road America race weekend, taking over the #8 car from Nicky Pastorelli. Dale Coyne Racing replaced Domínguez in the #19 car with Euroseries 3000 driver and one-time Minardi F1 tester Juan Cáceres of Uruguay.
German Andreas Wirth, the third-place finisher in the 2006 Champ Car Atlantic season, took over the Dale Coyne #19 car at Surfers Paradise and also finished the season with the team at Mexico City.
On October 24, following the race in Surfers Paradise, A. J. Allmendinger announced that he would drive for Team Red Bull in the NASCAR NEXTEL Cup Series in 2007.  On October 27 the Forsythe Racing team announced that Allmendinger would be replaced by 2004 Indianapolis 500 winner Buddy Rice for the final race of the season in Mexico City.  This would be Rice's only career Champ Car start.
On October 31, the Forsythe Racing team announced that they would run a third car in Mexico City.  Mexican David Martínez, a veteran of the Atlantics series, was signed to make his Champ Car debut driving the #33 car.
Paul Tracy did not race in the final round in Mexico City after he broke his right scapula in an alcohol-fueled accident that was alternately reported as happening on either an ATV or a golf cart. David Martínez ended up making his Champ Car debut driving Tracy's #3 car instead of the #33 he was originally slated to drive.

Season summary

Schedule 

 Oval/Speedway
 Dedicated road course
 Temporary street circuit

The initial 2006 schedule announced by Champ Car on August 13, 2005 contained 15 races.  The 15th race was scheduled to take place on a new permanent road course in Ansan, South Korea.  The scheduled 2005 race at the track was canceled in September 2005 when the circuit was determined to be unready to host the event.  A return to the Las Vegas Motor Speedway was also on the initial schedule, but on November 29, 2005 it was announced that the Champ Cars would be returning to Road America after a one-year hiatus instead of returning to the banked oval in Vegas. The race schedule shrank back to 14 races in July 2006 when it was announced that the event in Ansan had been canceled yet again. It was the third year in a row a Champ Car event in South Korea failed to materialize.

Race results

Final driver standings

Notes:
  Alex Tagliani withdrew from the race in Milwaukee after his car was heavily damaged in a crash during practice
  Mario Domínguez was docked 7 points for causing an avoidable crash in Milwaukee
  Paul Tracy was docked 7 points for causing an avoidable crash in San Jose
  Paul Tracy was once again docked 3 points for causing an avoidable crash in Denver
  Justin Wilson withdrew from the race in Surfers Paradise after breaking his wrist in a crash during practice

Nation's Cup 

 Top result per race counts towards the Nation's Cup

Notes 
 Mexico was penalized 7 points as a result of a penalty applied to Mario Domínguez in Milwaukee

Driver Breakdown

Notes

Round 2 
 Jimmy Vasser (PKV Racing #12) did not compete in Round 2.
 Nicky Pastorelli replaces Antônio Pizzonia in the Rocketsports Racing #8 car from Round 2 onwards.

Round 4 
 Mario Domínguez was penalized 7 points for causing avoidable contact in the race at the Milwaukee Mile.

Round 9 
 The first all-American Champ Car Panoz DP01 is launched on the weekend of the San Jose Grand Prix. Every team in the Champ Car World Series will be using the chassis next year.
 In San Jose, it was announced that Atlantic Series team Gelles Racing would run a two-car operation in next years Champ Car World Series.
 Paul Tracy was penalized 7 points and fined an undisclosed amount for causing avoidable contact and bringing the sport into disrepute for his part in the accident and shoving match with Alex Tagliani. He was also placed on probation for 3 races (Denver, Montreal & Road America). Tagliani was also fined an undisclosed amount.

Round 10 
 Cristiano da Matta was in a medically induced coma after a testing accident at Road America between San Jose & Denver in which he hit a deer on track. As a result, RuSPORT only run the car of Justin Wilson for the Denver round.
 Paul Tracy was penalised 3 points and fined US$25,000 for causing avoidable contact for his part in the accident with Sébastien Bourdais. His probation was also extended to include Surfers Paradise. Bourdais was not assessed a penalty.

References

See also
 2006 Champ Car Atlantic season
 2006 Indianapolis 500
 2006 IndyCar Series
 2006 Indy Pro Series season

Champ Car seasons
Champ Car
Champ Car
2006 in Champ Car
Champ Car